Dead Romance is an original novel by Lawrence Miles, originally published as part of the Virgin New Adventures series. The New Adventures were a spin-off from the long-running British science fiction television series Doctor Who. Though part of the sequence of stories that featured the fictional archaeologist Bernice Summerfield, this was released as something of a standalone, and she is not in it. The main character and narrator Christine Summerfield are not connected to her in any way. A former New Adventures Seventh Doctor companion, Chris Cwej, does appear. The Seventh Doctor briefly appears as "the Evil Renegade" in Chris's tampered memories.

Almost the entirety of the book is set within a bottle universe.  This concept is most fully explored in Miles's two-book cycle Interference, and it is implied that this bottle universe is the one which appears in Interference.

Christine Summerfield reappears as Cousin Eliza in the Faction Paradox audio plays (also by Miles), voiced by Emma Kilbey.

A second edition of Dead Romance was published by Mad Norwegian Press in 2004.  This contained some minor alterations which made the book more consistent with Miles's later Faction Paradox mythos.

The novel is partly an exploration of Miles's "bottle universe" concept that places Virgin Publishing's Virgin New Adventures series within a bottle universe inside the BBC Books Eighth Doctor Adventures universe (and by extension these bottles are within a larger one containing all televised serials). This concept is most fully explored in Miles's two-book cycle Interference.

This idea was never followed up on in any future novels and was abandoned. The idea of the book series' being in bottle universes inside each other was retconned in the Mad Norwegian Press reprint edition, with Miles himself stating in a foreword that this was a bad idea and was rightfully ignored.

See also
 Simulated reality
 Simulated reality in fiction

1999 British novels
1999 science fiction novels
Virgin New Adventures
Novels by Lawrence Miles
Faction Paradox
Fiction with unreliable narrators
Fictional diaries
Novels set in London
Apocalyptic novels
Alien invasions in novels
Self-reflexive novels